The public holidays in Gibraltar are a mix of "bank holidays" and "public holidays" and are often used interchangeably, although strictly and legally there is a difference. Bank holidays are holidays when banks and many other businesses are closed for the day. Public holidays are holidays which have been observed through custom and practice.

Notes

 In 2020, 8 May was also a public holiday to commemorate the 75th anniversary of VE Day.

References 

Gibraltar
Gibraltar